Ġēolamōnaþ or Ȝēolamōnaþ  (modern English: Yule month) was the Anglo-Saxon name for the month of both December and January. The Anglo-Saxon scholar Bede explains in his treatise De temporum ratione (The Reckoning of  Time) that the entire winter solstice period was known as Ġēola. Later on, December became known as Ǣrra-ġēolamōnaþ and January became known as Æfterra-ġēolamōnaþ, as this later Old English passage points out:

Which translates:

See also

Germanic calendar
Anglo-Saxon
Old English

References

December
January
Old English